Ulrik Damm is a Danish curler and curling coach.

At the national level, he is a 1996 Danish men's champion curler and two-time Danish mixed champion curler (1991, 2015).

Teams

Men's

Mixed

Record as a coach of national teams

References

External links

Living people
Danish male curlers
Danish curling champions
Danish curling coaches
Year of birth missing (living people)
Place of birth missing (living people)